Gaetano Pio Oristanio (born 28 September 2002) is an Italian professional footballer who plays as a midfielder for Eredivisie club Volendam, on loan from Inter Milan.

Club career
Oristanio played in the youth academy of Inter Milan until 2021.

In August 2021, Oristanio joined Eerste Divisie club Volendam on loan for the 2021–22 season. He made his debut for the club as a substitute in the 66th minute of the 1–3 league loss to ADO Den Haag on 13 August 2021. Following 35 appearances, 7 goals and achieving promotion to the Eredivisie on his first season, on 15 July 2022, Oristanio re-joined Volendam on another one-year loan.

Career statistics

Club

References

2002 births
Living people
Italian footballers
Italy youth international footballers
Italy under-21 international footballers
Association football midfielders
Eerste Divisie players
Inter Milan players
FC Volendam players
Italian expatriate footballers
Italian expatriate sportspeople in the Netherlands
Expatriate footballers in the Netherlands
Sportspeople from the Province of Salerno
Footballers from Campania